Burroughes is a surname. Notable people with the surname include:

 Henry Negus Burroughes (1791–1872), British politician
 Jeremy Burroughes (born 1960), British physicist and engineer
 Dorothy Burroughes (1883–1963), British artist

See also
 Burroughs (surname)